Wilma Josefina Salgado Tamayo (born 20 October 1952) is an Ecuadorian politician and economist.

Biography
Wilma Salgado was born on 20 October 1952 in Quito, capital of Ecuador. She acquired her bachelor's degree at the Pontificia Universidad Católica del Ecuador, master's degree from the Pantheon-Sorbonne University in Paris, and finally her PhD from the National Autonomous University of Mexico. On returning to Ecuador, Salgado was hired to work in the Central Bank of Ecuador as a director of economic forecasts, and would in 1991 serve as an economic adviser to the president of the Ecuadorian National Congress.

In March 2003, Salgado was appointed by President Lucio Gutiérrez as manager of the Deposit Guarantee Agency (AGD). As the manager of AGD, she ordered the seizure of goods from dozens of companies and individuals that owed money to the banks themselves bankrupted during the financial crisis of 1999, one of whom was former President of the National Congress , who had a house seized. Pons filed a lawsuit against Salgado, accusing her of perverting the course of justice, but Salgado was acquitted of the charges.

She was Minister of Finance in 2008.

Citations

1952 births
Living people
People from Quito
Ecuadorian socialists
Ecuadorian Ministers of Finance
Pontifical Catholic University of Ecuador alumni
University of Paris alumni
Women government ministers of Ecuador
Female finance ministers
20th-century Ecuadorian economists
21st-century Ecuadorian economists
21st-century Ecuadorian politicians
21st-century Ecuadorian women politicians
20th-century Ecuadorian women